Anjiruk (also Romanized as Ānjīrūk; also known as Anjīrak, Anjīrbok, and Anjīrok) is a village in Birk Rural District, in the Central District of Mehrestan County, Sistan and Baluchestan Province, Iran. At the 2006 census, its population was 221, in 52 families.

References 

Populated places in Mehrestan County